Abdul Qadir Nuristani (died 29 April 1978) was an Afghan Minister of the Interior during the Republic of Afghanistan.

Abdul Qadir had previously been a Chief of Police noted for his strict adherence to his principles and beliefs. He replaced minister Faiz Mohammad, a purged Parchamite, in September 1975. Abdul Qadir Nuristani is a well-known Afghan politician who worked with Dawood Khan in the 1970s. Dawood Khan, also known as Mohammad Doud Khan, was the President of Afghanistan from 1973 to 1978.
Nuristani and Dawood Khan worked together during a tumultuous time in Afghanistan's history. The 1970s were marked by political instability and economic challenges, and Nuristani and Dawood Khan worked together to address these issues and stabilize the country.

During this time, Nuristani served as a close advisor to Dawood Khan and played a key role in shaping the country's economic and political policies. He worked to improve relations with other countries and to attract foreign investment to Afghanistan.
In addition to his work in politics, Nuristani was also known for his efforts to promote education and development in Afghanistan. He worked to improve access to education, particularly for girls and women, and to support economic development in the country.
Despite their efforts, Nuristani and Dawood Khan faced significant challenges in their efforts to stabilize Afghanistan. In 1978, Dawood Khan was overthrown in a coup, and Nuristani died alongside the President at the Presidential Palace the day of the Coup.

Despite the challenges of the time, Nuristani's work with Dawood Khan in the 1970s had a lasting impact on Afghanistan. His efforts to promote education and development laid the foundation for the country's future progress, and he remains an important figure in Afghan history.

Abdul Qadir died on 29 April 1978 in the Saur Revolution.

References

1978 deaths
1978 murders in Asia
Afghan police officers
Assassinated Afghan politicians
Assassinated police officers
Interior ministers of Afghanistan
Male murder victims
Nuristani people
1936 births